The western barn owl (Tyto alba) is usually considered a subspecies group and together with the American barn owl group, the eastern barn owl group, and sometimes the Andaman masked owl make up the barn owl.  The cosmopolitan barn owl is recognized by most taxonomic authorities. A few (including the International Ornithologists' Union) separate them

Taxonomy
The western barn owl was formally described in 1769 by the Austrian naturalist Giovanni Antonio Scopoli under the binomial name Strix alba. The type locality is the Friuli area of northeast Italy. The specific epithet is from Latin albus meaning "white". This owl is now placed in the genus Tyto that was introduced in 1828 by the Swedish naturalist Gustaf Johan Billberg.

Ten subspecies are recognised:
 T. a. alba (Scopoli, 1769) – northwest Africa, west, south Europe to the Balkans
 T. a. guttata (Brehm, CL, 1831) – central Europe and east Balkans to the Ukraine
 T. a. ernesti (Kleinschmidt, 1901 – Corsica and Sardinia
 T. a. erlangeri Sclater, WL, 1921 – Crete and Cyprus through the Middle East to south Iran
 T. a. schmitzi (Hartert, E, 1900) – Madeira
 T. a. gracilirostris (Hartert, E, 1905) – east Canary Islands
 T. a. detorta Hartert, E, 1913 – Cape Verde Islands
 T. a. poensis (Fraser, 1843) – Africa south of the Sahara, island of Bioko (Gulf of Guinea) (includes affinis)
 T. a. thomensis (Hartlaub, 1852) – island of São Tomé (Gulf of Guinea)
 T. a. hypermetra Grote, 1928 – Comoros and Madagascar

Distribution
Its range includes all of Europe (except Fennoscandia and Malta), and most of Africa apart from the Sahara.

In continental Europe the distance travelled is greater, commonly somewhere between  but exceptionally , with ringed birds from the Netherlands ending up in Spain and in Ukraine. Movements in the African continent include  from Senegambia to Sierra Leone and up to  within South Africa.

Behaviour and ecology
Like most owls, the barn owl is nocturnal, relying on its acute sense of hearing when hunting in complete darkness. It often becomes active shortly before dusk and can sometimes be seen during the day when relocating from one roosting site to another. In Britain, it sometimes hunts by day. This practice may depend on whether the owl is mobbed by other birds if it emerges in daylight. However, in Britain, some birds continue to hunt by day even when mobbed by such birds as magpies, rooks and black-headed gulls, such diurnal activity possibly occurring when the previous night has been wet making hunting difficult. By contrast, in southern Europe and the tropics, the birds seem to be almost exclusively nocturnal, with the few birds that hunt by day being severely mobbed.

Barn owls are not particularly territorial but have a home range inside which they forage. Female home ranges largely coincide with that of their mates. Outside the breeding season, males and females usually roost separately, each one having about three favoured sites in which to conceal themselves by day, and which are also visited for short periods during the night. Roosting sites include holes in trees, fissures in cliffs, disused buildings, chimneys and haysheds and are often small in comparison to nesting sites. As the breeding season approaches, the birds move back to the vicinity of the chosen nest to roost.

This owl prefers to hunt along the edges of woods or in rough grass strips adjoining pasture. It has an effortless wavering flight as it quarters the ground, alert to the sounds made by potential prey. Like most owls, the barn owl flies silently; tiny serrations on the leading edges of its flight feathers and a hairlike fringe to the trailing edges help to break up the flow of air over the wings, thereby reducing turbulence and the noise that accompanies it. Hairlike extensions to the barbules of its feathers, which give the plumage a soft feel, also minimise noise produced during wingbeats. The behaviour and ecological preferences may differ slightly even among neighbouring subspecies, as shown in the case of the European T. a. guttata and  T. a. alba that probably evolved, respectively, in allopatric glacial refugia in southeastern Europe, and in Iberia or southern France.

Diet and feeding

The diet of the barn owl has been much studied; the items consumed can be ascertained from identifying the prey fragments in the pellets of indigestible matter that the bird regurgitates. Studies of diet have been made in most parts of the bird's range, and in moist temperate areas over 90% of the prey tends to be small mammals, whereas in hot, dry, unproductive areas, the proportion is lower, and a great variety of other creatures are eaten depending on local abundance. Most prey is terrestrial but bats and birds are also taken, as well as lizards, amphibians and insects. Even when they are plentiful and other prey scarce, earthworms do not seem to be consumed.

In most of Europe, voles predominate in the diet and shrews are the second most common food choice. Mice and rats form the main foodstuffs in the Mediterranean region. Barn owls are usually more specialist feeders in productive areas and generalists in drier areas. On the Cape Verde Islands, geckos are the mainstay of the diet, supplemented by birds such as plovers, godwits, turnstones, weavers and pratincoles, and on a rocky islet off the coast of California, a clutch of four young were being reared on a diet of Leach's storm petrel (Oceanodroma leucorhoa). In Ireland, the accidental introduction of the bank vole in the 1950s led to a major shift in the barn owl's diet: where their ranges overlap, the vole is now by far the largest prey item. Locally superabundant rodent species in the weight class of several grams per individual usually make up the single largest proportion of prey. The barn owl hunts by flying slowly, quartering the ground and hovering over spots that may conceal prey. It may also use branches, fence posts or other lookouts to scan its surroundings, and this is the main means of prey location.:) The bird has long, broad wings, enabling it to manoeuvre and turn abruptly. Its legs and toes are long and slender which improves its ability to forage among dense foliage or beneath the snow and gives it a wide spread of talons when attacking prey. Studies have shown that an individual barn owl may eat one or more voles (or their equivalent) per night, equivalent to about twenty-three percent of the bird's bodyweight. Excess food is often cached at roosting sites and can be used when food is scarce.

Small prey is usually torn into chunks and eaten completely including bones and fur, while prey larger than about 100 g (4 oz), such as baby rabbits, Cryptomys blesmols, or Otomys vlei rats, is usually dismembered and the inedible parts discarded. Contrary to what is sometimes assumed, the barn owl does not eat domestic animals on any sort of regular basis. Regionally, non-rodent foods are used as per availability. On bird-rich islands, a barn owl might include some fifteen to twenty percent of birds in its diet, while in grassland it will gorge itself on swarming termites, or on Orthoptera such as Copiphorinae katydids, Jerusalem crickets (Stenopelmatidae) or true crickets (Gryllidae). Bats and even frogs, lizards and snakes may make a minor but significant contribution to the diet; small Soricomorpha like Suncus shrews may be a secondary prey of major importance.

The barn owl has acute hearing, with ears placed asymmetrically. This improves detection of sound position and distance and the bird does not require sight to hunt. The facial disc plays a part in this process, as is shown by the fact that with the ruff feathers removed, the bird can still locate the source in azimuth but fails to do so in elevation. Hunting nocturnally or crepuscularly, this bird can target its prey and dive to the ground, penetrating its talons through snow, grass or brush to seize small creatures with deadly accuracy. Compared to other owls of similar size, the barn owl has a much higher metabolic rate, requiring relatively more food. Weight for weight, barn owls consume more rodents—often regarded as pests by humans—than possibly any other creature. This makes the barn owl one of the most economically valuable wildlife animals for agriculture. Farmers often find these owls more effective than poison in keeping down rodent pests, and they can encourage barn owl habitation by providing nest sites.

Breeding

Barn owls living in tropical regions can breed at any time of year, but some seasonality in nesting is still evident. Where there are distinct wet and dry seasons, egg-laying usually takes place during the dry season, with increased rodent prey becoming available to the birds as the vegetation dies off. In arid regions, breeding may be irregular and may happen in wet periods, triggered by temporary increases in the populations of small mammals. In temperate climates, nesting seasons become more distinct and there are some seasons of the year when no egg-laying takes place. In Europe, most nesting takes place between March and June when temperatures are increasing. The actual dates of egg-laying vary by year and by location, being correlated with the amount of prey-rich foraging habitat around the nest site and often with the phase of the rodent abundance cycle. An increase in rodent populations will usually stimulate the local barn owls to begin nesting; thus, even in the cooler parts of its range, two broods are often raised in a good year.

Females are ready to breed at 10 to 11 months of age, although males sometimes wait until the following year. Western barn owls are usually monogamous, sticking to one partner for life unless one of the pair dies. During the non-breeding season they may roost separately, but as the breeding season approaches they return to their established nesting site, showing considerable site fidelity. In colder climates, in harsh weather and where winter food supplies may be scarce, they may roost in farm buildings and in barns between hay bales, but they then run the risk that their selected nesting hole may be taken over by some other, earlier-nesting species. Single males may establish feeding territories, patrolling the hunting areas, occasionally stopping to hover, and perching on lofty eminences where they screech to attract a mate. Where a female has lost her mate but maintained her breeding site, she usually seems to manage to attract a new spouse.

Once a pair-bond has been formed, the male will make short flights at dusk around the nesting and roosting sites and then longer circuits to establish a home range. When he is later joined by the female, there is much chasing, turning and twisting in flight, and frequent screeches, the male's being high-pitched and tremulous and the female's lower and harsher. At later stages of courtship, the male emerges at dusk, climbs high into the sky and then swoops back to the vicinity of the female at speed. He then sets off to forage. The female meanwhile sits in an eminent position and preens, returning to the nest a minute or two before the male arrives with food for her.  Such feeding behaviour of the female by the male is common, helps build the pair-bond and increases the female's fitness before egg-laying commences.

Western barn owls are cavity nesters. They choose holes in trees, fissures in cliff faces, the large nests of other birds such as the hamerkop (Scopus umbretta) and old buildings such as farm sheds and church towers. Buildings are preferred to trees in wetter climates in the British Isles and provide better protection for fledglings from inclement weather. No nesting material is used as such but, as the female sits incubating the eggs, she draws in the dry furry material of which her regurgitated pellets are composed, so that by the time the chicks are hatched, they are surrounded by a carpet of shredded pellets. Oftentimes other birds such as jackdaws (Corvus monedula) nest in the same hollow tree or building and seem to live harmoniously with the owls.

Before commencing laying, the female spends much time near the nest and is entirely provisioned by the male. Meanwhile, the male roosts nearby and may cache any prey that is surplus to their requirements. When the female has reached peak weight, the male provides a ritual presentation of food and copulation occurs at the nest. The female lays eggs on alternate days and the clutch size averages about five eggs (range two to nine). The eggs are chalky white, somewhat elliptical and about the size of bantam's eggs, and incubation begins as soon as the first egg is laid. While she is sitting on the nest, the male is constantly bringing more provisions and they may pile up beside the female. The incubation period is about thirty days, hatching takes place over a prolonged period and the youngest chick may be several weeks younger than its oldest sibling. In years with plentiful supplies of food, there may be a hatching success rate of about 75%. The male continues to copulate with the female when he brings food which makes the newly hatched chicks vulnerable to injury.

The chicks are at first covered with greyish-white down and develop rapidly. Within a week they can hold their heads up and shuffle around in the nest. The female tears up the food brought by the male and distributes it to the chicks. Initially these make a "chittering" sound but this soon changes into a food-demanding "snore". By two weeks old they are already half their adult weight and look naked as the amount of down is insufficient to cover their growing bodies. By three weeks old, quills are starting to push through the skin and the chicks stand, making snoring noises with wings raised and tail stumps waggling, begging for food items which are now given whole. The male is the main provider of food until all the chicks are at least four weeks old at which time the female begins to leave the nest and starts to roost elsewhere. By the sixth week the chicks are as big as the adults but have slimmed down somewhat by the ninth week when they are fully fledged and start leaving the nest briefly themselves. They are still dependent on the parent birds until about thirteen weeks and receive training from the female in finding, and eventually catching, prey.

In temperate areas, the male owl moults rather later in the year than the female, at a time when there is an abundance of food, the female has recommenced hunting and the demands of the chicks are lessening. Unmated males without family responsibilities often start losing feathers earlier in the year. The moult follows a similar prolonged pattern to that of the female and the first sign that the male is moulting is often when a tail feather has been dropped at the roost. A consequence of moulting is the loss of thermal insulation.

Predators and parasites
The Eurasian eagle-owl (B. bubo) are noted predators of barn owls. In Africa, the principle predators of barn owls are Verreaux's eagle-owls and Cape eagle-owls. In Europe, although less dangerous than the eagle owl, the chief diurnal predators are the northern goshawk (Accipiter gentilis) and the common buzzard (Buteo buteo). About a dozen other large diurnal raptors and owls have also been reported as predators of barn owls, ranging from the scarcely larger tawny owl to the golden eagle. The goshawk and the eagle owl are on the increase because of the greater protection these birds now receive. 

When disturbed at its roosting site, an angry barn owl lowers its head and sways it from side to side, or the head may be lowered and stretched forward and the wings drooped while the bird emits hisses and makes snapping noises with its beak. A defensive attitude involves lying flat on the ground or crouching with wings spread out.

Lifespan

Unusually for such a medium-sized carnivorous animal, the barn owl exhibits r-selection, producing large number of offspring with a high growth rate, many of which have a relatively low probability of surviving to adulthood. While wild barn owls are thus decidedly short-lived, the actual longevity of the species is much higher – captive individuals may reach twenty years of age or more. But occasionally, a wild bird reaches an advanced age. A Dutch owl was noted to have reached an age of seventeen years, ten months. Another captive barn owl, in England, lived to be over twenty-five years old. Taking into account such extremely long-lived individuals, the average lifespan of the barn owl is about four years, and statistically two-thirds to three-quarters of all adults survive from one year to the next. However, the mortality is not evenly distributed throughout the bird's life, and only one young in three manages to live to its first breeding attempt.

The most significant cause of death in temperate areas is likely to be starvation, particularly over the autumn and winter period when first year birds are still perfecting their hunting skills. In northern and upland areas, there is some correlation between mortality in older birds and adverse weather, deep-lying snow and prolonged low temperatures. Collision with road vehicles is another cause of mortality, and may result when birds forage on mown verges. Some of these birds are in poor condition and may have been less able to evade oncoming vehicles than fit individuals would have been. Historically, many deaths were caused by the use of pesticides, and this may still be the case in some parts of the world. Collisions with power-lines kill some birds and shooting accounts for others, especially in Mediterranean regions.

Subspecies

Status and conservation
Barn owls are relatively common throughout most of their range and not considered globally threatened. However, locally severe declines from organochlorine (e.g., DDT) poisoning in the mid-20th century and rodenticides in the late 20th century have affected some populations. Intensification of agricultural practices often means that the rough grassland that provides the best foraging habitat is lost. While barn owls are prolific breeders and able to recover from short-term population decreases, they are not as common in some areas as they used to be. A 1995–1997 survey put their British population at between 3,000 and 5,000 breeding pairs, out of an average of about 150,000 pairs in the whole of Europe. In the European Community they are considered a Species of European Concern.

In some areas, it may be an insufficiency of suitable nesting sites that is the factor limiting barn owl numbers. The provision of nest boxes under the eaves of buildings and in other locations can be very successful in increasing the local population.

The Canary barn owl is particularly at risk, and as late as 1975, hunting by fearful locals was limiting the population on Fuerteventura where only a few dozen pairs remain. On Lanzarote a somewhat larger number of these birds still seem to exist, but altogether this particular subspecies is precariously rare: Probably less than three hundred and perhaps fewer than two hundred individuals still remain. Similarly, the birds on the western Canary Islands which are usually assigned to the nominate subspecies have declined much, and here wanton destruction seems still to be significant. On Tenerife they seem relatively numerous but on the other islands, the situation looks about as bleak as on Fuerteventura. Due to their assignment to the nominate subspecies, which is common in mainland Spain, the western Canary Islands population is not classified as threatened.

In the United Kingdom, the "Barn Owl Nest Box Scheme" is promoted by the World Owl Trust and has many participants in local areas such as Somerset, where a webcam has been set up inside a nest box in which seven young were reared in 2014. In May 2012, it was revealed that farmers in Israel and Jordan had, over a period of ten years, replaced pesticides with barn owls in a joint conservation venture called "Project Barn Owl".

References

Bibliography

Further reading

western barn owl
Falconry
Birds of Africa
Birds of Eurasia
western barn owl
Taxa named by Giovanni Antonio Scopoli